Ivan Yeo (born March 2, 1993 in Kelantan, Malaysia) is a Malaysian professional basketball player who currently plays for the Westports Malaysia Dragons of the ASEAN Basketball League (ABL). Yeo is one of Malaysia's most prominent basketball figures.

He averaged most minutes, points and rebounds for the Malaysia national basketball team at the 2015 FIBA Asia Championship in Changsha, China.

References

1993 births
Living people
Centers (basketball)
Malaysian men's basketball players
People from Kelantan
Power forwards (basketball)
Kuala Lumpur Dragons players